Karwan University is a degree-awarding tertiary educational institution in Kabul, Afghanistan. It was founded in 2007 and is registered with the Afghan Ministry of Higher Education, Sayed Javid Andish was Chairman of Karwan and also a majority shareholder and Chairman of Afghanistan Commercial Bank.

History
Karwan University is registered with the Ministry of Higher Education of Afghanistan. In late 2009, it officially became a university. Its founder is Sayed Javed Andish, who is a businessman and Chairman of Afghanistan Universities Association and advisor of Afghanistan Chamber of Commerce and Industries.

Departments and programs
Karwan University offers bachelor's degrees in business administration, economics, Law, political science, agriculture, pharmacy, journalism and computer science. It also offers Accounting courses, Diploma in Business Administration, Information Technology, English Language, Literacy, security courses and Civil Engineering.

Karwan University commenced delivery of Economics, BBA (Bachelor of Business Administration), Computer Science, Law and Political Science undergraduate courses. Karwan University was helped by foreign-educated Afghan friends and well wishers before receiving foreign recognition for this private university.

Key people
Chairman and Founder: Sayed Javed Andish
Chancellor: Janat Fahim Chakari
Operations and Finance Vice Chancellor: Ehsanullah Khalilzoy
Academic Vice Chancellor: Ismail Roshangar
IT Manager: Nasir Zahir
HR Manager: SAYED ABDULLAH ROHANI

See also
List of universities in Afghanistan

References

External links 
Official Website

Universities in Afghanistan
Educational institutions established in 2007
2007 establishments in Afghanistan
Universities and colleges in Kabul